Rhyzolaelaps is a genus of mites in the family Laelapidae.

Species
 Rhyzolaelaps inaequipilis Bregetova & Grokhovskaya, 1961     
 Rhyzolaelaps lodianensis Gu & Wang, 1979     
 Rhyzolaelaps rhizomydis Wang, Liao & Lin, 1980     
 Rhyzolaelaps sinoamericanus Gu, Whitaker & Baccus, 1990

References

Laelapidae